Mobile Airport may refer to two airports in Mobile, Alabama:
Mobile Downtown Airport
Mobile Regional Airport